The Entrance Hall (also called the Grand Foyer) is the primary and formal entrance to the White House, the official residence of the president of the United States. The room is rectilinear in shape and measures approximately 31 by 44 feet. Located on the State Floor, the room is entered from outdoors through the North Portico, which faces the North Lawn and Pennsylvania Avenue. The south side of the room opens to the Cross Hall through a screen of paired Roman Doric columns. The east wall opens to the Grand Staircase.

Hoban's 1792 and 1817 designs
Architect James Hoban's original floor plans show a similar room, but with single columns separating the Entrance Hall and Cross Hall, and with the Grand Stair entering into the Cross Hall. Mid-19th century photographs show the room as rebuilt by Hoban following the 1814 White House fire. In these photographs two Ionic columns support a series of shallow arches, and a frieze of bas-relief anthemion encircling the room. The shafts of Hoban's columns are recorded as being a blue marble.

With the north entrance to the White House used frequently in this period, it was not uncommon for cold air to push into the Entrance Hall and then pass through the spaciously separated columns into the Cross Hall beyond. To remedy the draft problem, President Martin Van Buren had floor-to-ceiling glass partitions installed between the Hoban columns.

Changes by Walter and Brumidi
In 1853 Thomas U. Walter installed a cast iron and clear glass screen between the Entrance Hall and Cross Hall to reduce drafts, and a complexly patterned Minton encaustic tile floor. In 1869 Constantino Brumidi, the fresco painter who had recently painted The Apotheosis of Washington in the ceiling of the new rotunda and Senate wing of the Capitol, applied highly ornamental painted decoration to the walls and ceilings including profile portraits of George Washington and Abraham Lincoln. On the ceiling Brumidi painted allegorical figures of Union and Liberty. They have survived and are displayed in the ground floor of the White House in the Palm Room.

Tiffany and the Aesthetic Movement
In 1882 President Chester A. Arthur commissioned Louis Comfort Tiffany to replace Walter's clear glass panels in the screen and the front door with fashionable colored art glass. The patterns included American eagles, and a shield with stripes, stars, and the initials "U.S." A high example of the Aesthetic Movement, Tiffany's glass would remain into the early 20th century. A recreation of the Tiffany screen was painted by artist Peter Waddell in 2004.

McKim's return to Neoclassicism
In 1902, soon after taking office and occupying the White House, President Theodore Roosevelt engaged architect Charles Follen McKim in the redesign of the White House. McKim reconfigured the house, adding wings, demolishing the greenhouses, and sweeping away the ornate late 19th century interiors.  McKim attempted to make the White House interiors appear closer to how they had near the time of construction, during the period of the early republic. McKim's office McKim, Mead, and White researched the house's history, and where no clear documentation was available created rooms in the then popular Colonial Revival and Beaux Arts styles.

In the Entrance Hall, McKim removed the Tiffany screen, Hoban's Ionic columns, and the ornamental painting. In its place he created a far simpler neoclassical interior. On the south side of the room is a screen of single and paired Roman Doric columns. Doric pilasters are used on the east, north and west wall. A robust entablature of triglyphs, garlanded bureaucrania, ornamental cuirass, and spread Roman eagles integrate the frieze and ceiling. A simple color palette of soft ochres, gray and white contrasted dramatically with the Victorian era interior. The presidential arms were cast in bronze and installed in the center of the room's floor. Bronze torchères, still in use, and a simple lantern with a cylindrical glass chimney lit the room. McKim's new finishes though robust in form were made of plaster and stucco over wood frames hastily added to Hoban's original surfaces. While the response to McKim's interiors were positive, the Entrance Hall has been criticized for being more appropriate to a public building than a home.

Truman reconstruction
By 1948 the White House had become physically unstable, and the house was temporarily abandoned while a major reconstruction took place. The building's interior was dismantled, the furnishings and decorative items were stored, and a new steel frame was built within the exterior walls. Truman used this opportunity to reposition the entrance to the Grand Stair. Architect Lorenzo Simmons Winslow explored several options for the reorientation of the Grand Stair before convincing President Truman of the present configuration where it opens to the center of the east wall of the Entrance Hall. Except for the new stair opening, most of McKim's design was followed but now reinterpreted in light gray Joliet marble instead of warm hued Sienna stone and painted plaster. Cut into the stone casement around the opening to the Grand Staircase are the seals of the thirteen original American states. The Truman era floor is laid in a tessellated pattern of Westbury cream and  Vermont marble. Truman thought it inappropriate to walk across the seal of the president that McKim had placed in the floor, and had the bronze seal moved to the ground floor above the entrance to the Diplomatic Reception Room. In place of the bronze seal in the floor, Truman had a polychrome painted plaster seal installed above the entrance to the Blue Room.

Kennedy restoration
During the John F. Kennedy administration, the Entrance Hall (like most of the White House) underwent an extensive historic redecoration. The redecoration of the State Floor rooms, including the Entrance Hall, was overseen by American antiques autodidact Henry Francis du Pont and French interior designer Stéphane Boudin. Du Pont wanted a more historic approach to the White House, while Boudin preferred a French design aesthetic. Du Pont originally redecorated the Entrance Hall with two French pier tables, a settee, a card table, and two tables by Charles-Honoré Lannuier. Boudin had all but the pier tables removed, and his style is the one which remained over the next several decades.

Use over time
When the White House interiors were first completed during the administration of John Adams the house was primarily entered from a temporary wooden piazza on the south. President Thomas Jefferson used the Entrance Hall as a "Cabinet of Natural History" displaying finds from the Lewis and Clark Expedition.

In the 20th century the Entrance Hall has been used for official welcomes, receiving lines, small concerts, and dancing. Actor John Travolta danced with Diana, Princess of Wales in 1985; in 1998 First Lady Hillary Clinton danced here with Czech President Václav Havel.

Furnishings
On the west wall of the room is a gilded beech French Empire pier table (c. 1812) by cabinetmaker Pierre-Antoine Bellange purchased for the Blue Room by President James Monroe. On the pier table is an ormolu French Empire mantel clock featuring a sculpture of Minerva. This clock was manufactured by the bronzier Pierre-Philippe Thomire and also bought by Monroe, it was previously located in the Blue Room.

In the southeast and southwest corners of the Entrance Hall are crimson and gold upholstered French Empire banquettes acquired by interior designer Stéphane Boudin of Maison Jansen during the John F. Kennedy administration. The McKim era bronze torchères remain in the room.  A pair of Louis XVI torchères flank the door leading to the North Portico. A pair of  armchairs commissioned for the Blue Room in 1902 and based on a suite of chairs designed by Jacob-Desmalter in the Salon des Fleurs of the Château de Compiègne are placed on the North wall.

References
Notes

Citations

Bibliography

Further reading 
 Abbott, James A. A Frenchman in Camelot: The Decoration of the Kennedy White House by Stéphane Boudin. Boscobel Restoration Inc.: 1995. .
 Abbott, James A. Jansen. Acanthus Press: 2006. .
 Abbott, James Archer. Jansen Furniture. Acanathus Press: 2007. .
 Clinton, Hillary Rodham. An Invitation to the White House: At Home with History. Simon & Schuster: 2000. .
 Leish, Kenneth. The White House. Newsweek Book Division: 1972. .
 Monkman, Betty C. The White House: The Historic Furnishing & First Families. Abbeville Press: 2000. .
 Seale, William. The President's House. White House Historical Association and the National Geographic Society: 1986. .
 West, J.B. with Mary Lynn Kotz. Upstairs at the White House: My Life with the First Ladies. Coward, McCann & Geoghegan: 1973. .
 The White House: An Historic Guide. White House Historical Association and the National Geographic Society: 2001. .

External links

 White House website for the Entrance and Cross Hall
 White House Museum's Entrance Hall page, with many additional historical pictures

Rooms in the White House